Pernilla Zethraeus, born in 1962, is a former Swedish politician of the Left Party. She was a member of the Riksdag between 2006 and 2008, when she was relieved of duty at her own request due to health issues related to ME/CFS. She served as the party secretary for the Left Party between 2000 and 2006.

References

External links 
Pernilla Zethraeus at the Riksdag website

1962 births
Women members of the Riksdag
Living people
Members of the Riksdag 2006–2010
21st-century Swedish women politicians